New Riders of the Purple Sage is an American country rock band. The group emerged from the psychedelic rock scene in San Francisco in 1969 and its original lineup included several members of the Grateful Dead. The band is sometimes referred to as the New Riders or as NRPS.

History

Origins: early 1960s – 1969
The roots of the New Riders can be traced back to the early 1960s Peninsula folk/beatnik scene centered on Stanford University's now-defunct Perry Lane housing complex in Menlo Park, California where future Grateful Dead guitarist Jerry Garcia often played gigs with like-minded guitarist David Nelson. The young John Dawson (also known as "Marmaduke") also played some concerts with Garcia, Nelson, and their compatriots while visiting relatives on summer vacation. Enamored of the sounds of Bakersfield-style country music, Dawson would turn his older friends on to the work of Merle Haggard and Buck Owens and provided a vital link between Timothy Leary's International Federation for Internal Freedom in Millbrook, New York (Dawson having boarded at the Millbrook School) and the Menlo Park bohemian coterie nurtured by Ken Kesey.

Inspired by American folk music, rock and roll, and blues, Garcia formed the Grateful Dead (initially known as The Warlocks) with blues singer Ron "Pigpen" McKernan, while Nelson joined the similarly inclined New Delhi River Band (which would eventually come to include bassist Dave Torbert) shortly thereafter. Although they lacked the managerial acumen and cultural cachet of the Grateful Dead and elected to remain in East Palo Alto, California unlike the former group, which soon relocated to the Haight-Ashbury district of San Francisco, the New Delhi River Band were considered by late 1966 to be the house band of The Barn (one of the region's few viable concert venues outside of San Francisco) in Scotts Valley, California. The group continued to enjoy a cult following in Santa Clara and Santa Cruz Counties through the Summer of Love until their dissolution in early 1968.

After a period of inactivity Nelson contributed to the Grateful Dead's Aoxomoxoa (1969) sessions and served as the caretaker of Big Brother and the Holding Company's rehearsal space while guitarist Peter Albin and drummer David Getz undertook a European tour with Country Joe & the Fish following the schismatic departure of Janis Joplin and Sam Andrew from the former band in December 1968. During this period Nelson and Garcia played intermittently in an early iteration of High Country, a traditional bluegrass ensemble formed by the remnants of the Peninsula folk scene. Nelson was set to serve as lead guitarist in the reconstituted lineup of Big Brother that coalesced later in 1969 and thus may have contributed to some of the recordings on Be a Brother (1970) during this transitional period.

Dawson—who dropped out of Occidental College in December 1965 and remained in Los Angeles for several years thereafter, "hanging out with musicians and weirdos"—had returned to Los Altos Hills by early 1969, allowing him to contribute to the Aoxomoxoa sessions and briefly enroll at Foothill College. After a mescaline experience at Pinnacles National Park with Torbert and Matthew Kelly, he began to compose songs on a regular basis. Some (such as "Glendale Train" and "I Don't Know You") were traditional country pastiches; a number of others ("Last Lonely Eagle", "Garden of Eden", and "Dirty Business") found him working in a "psychedelic country" fusion milieu redolent of Gram Parsons' nascent Flying Burrito Brothers. "Henry", a traditional shuffle with contemporary lyrics about marijuana smuggling, also dates from this period.

Dawson's vision was prescient, as 1969 marked the emergence of country rock via Bob Dylan, The Band, The Flying Burrito Brothers, Poco, the Dillard & Clark Band, and the Clarence White-era Byrds. Around this time, Garcia was similarly inspired to take up the pedal steel guitar, and an informal line-up including Dawson, Garcia, and Peninsula folk veteran Peter Grant (on banjo) began playing coffeehouse and hofbrau concerts together when the Grateful Dead were not touring. Their repertoire included country standards, traditional bluegrass, Dawson originals, and a few Dylan covers ("Lay Lady Lay", "You Ain't Goin' Nowhere", "Mighty Quinn"). By the summer of 1969 it was decided that a full band would be formed and David Nelson was recruited to play lead guitar.

In addition to Nelson, Dawson (on acoustic guitar), and Garcia (continuing to play pedal steel), the original line-up of the band that came to be known as the New Riders of the Purple Sage (a nod to the Foy Willing-led Western swing combo from the 1940s, Riders of the Purple Sage, which borrowed its name from the Zane Grey novel) consisted of Alembic Studio engineer Bob Matthews on electric bass and Mickey Hart of the Grateful Dead on drums; bassist Phil Lesh also played sporadically with the ensemble in lieu of Matthews through the end of the year, as documented by the late 1969 demos later included on the Before Time Began archival release. Lyricist Robert Hunter briefly rehearsed with the band on bass in early 1970 before the permanent hiring of Torbert in April of that year. The most commercially successful configuration of the New Riders would come to encompass Dawson, Nelson, Torbert, Spencer Dryden, and Buddy Cage.

Vintage NRPS: 1969–1982

After a few warmup gigs throughout the Bay Area in 1969, Dawson, Nelson, and Torbert began to tour in May 1970 as part of a tripartite bill advertised as "An Evening with the Grateful Dead". An acoustic Grateful Dead set that often included contributions from Dawson and Nelson would then segue into New Riders and electric Dead sets, obviating the need to hire external opening acts.

By the time the New Riders recorded their first album in late 1970, change was in the air. Hart temporarily left the Grateful Dead in February 1971. Although Hart contributed to two tracks on the album, former Jefferson Airplane drummer Spencer Dryden replaced him in the New Riders prior to his departure from the parent group. Dryden would remain with the group for ten years, ultimately serving as the band's manager. 

Their first album, eponymously titled was released on Columbia Records (under a contract informed by Clive Davis's long-term aspiration to sign the Grateful Dead) in late 1971. It proved to be a moderate success comparable to the Dead's releases of the era, peaking at No. 39 on the Billboard 200 chart. Entirely composed by Dawson (in comparison to the more egalitarian songwriting of later releases), the record was driven by Garcia's pedal-steel playing.

With the New Riders desiring to become more of a self-sufficient group and Garcia needing to focus on his other responsibilities, the musician parted ways with the group in November 1971. Seasoned pedal steel player Buddy Cage was recruited from Ian and Sylvia's Great Speckled Bird to replace Garcia. The band's second album, Powerglide (1972), was the first to feature this line-up. The Powerglide album art included a notable caricature of the band members drawn by Lore Shoberg.

1973's The Adventures of Panama Red included a Nelson-sung cover of Peter Rowan's "Panama Red" that steadily gained traction as an enduring FM radio staple. The album peaked at No. 55 in Billboard and, albeit as a sleeper hit, marked the band's commercial zenith; in 1979, it was certified gold by RIAA.

In the mid-1970s, Radio Caroline adopted the song "On My Way Back Home" from the Gypsy Cowboy album as the station's theme tune. The song was well-suited to the station's album-oriented format of the time, and included the lyric "Flying to the sun, sweet Caroline".

The New Riders of the Purple Sage continued touring and releasing albums throughout the late 1970s and early 1980s to an increasingly fallow reception; none of the albums that followed New Riders (1976) charted on the Billboard 200 in antipodal contrast to the widespread mainstream success of the outlaw country movement (exemplified by Willie Nelson and Waylon Jennings) and such second-wave country rock groups as The Eagles, Pure Prairie League, and Firefall. The band continued to open several Grateful Dead and Jerry Garcia Band shows in 1977 and 1978, including the final concert preceding the closure of Winterland Ballroom on December 31, 1978. 

In 1974, Torbert left NRPS; he and Matthew Kelly co-founded the band Kingfish (best known for Bob Weir's membership during the Grateful Dead's late-1974 to mid-1976 touring hiatus) the year before. Initially he was replaced by Skip Battin (formerly of Skip & Flip and the early 1970s lineup of The Byrds), who briefly emerged as the dominant creative force in the band due to his prolific songwriting collaboration with controversial Hollywood impresario Kim Fowley. Stephen A. Love of Rick Nelson's Stone Canyon Band and the Roger McGuinn Band replaced Battin after he left the group to co-found a reconstituted lineup of The Flying Burrito Brothers in 1976. Shortly thereafter, Spencer Dryden relinquished his performance duties to manage the group in 1977. His musical replacement was Patrick Shanahan. Allen Kemp joined on bass in 1978 before emerging as a co-frontman on guitar and vocals, contributing prominently to the songwriting for the band's last major label release, 1981's  Feelin' All Right. 

In 1982, Nelson and Cage left the band, leaving Dawson as the sole remaining member from the classic lineup.

New New Riders: 1982–1997
From the early 1980s to the late 1990s Dawson continued as leader of the New Riders of the Purple Sage. He was joined by bluegrass-oriented multi-instrumentalist Rusty Gauthier, who sang and played acoustic guitar, slide guitar, mandolin, banjo, and fiddle. During this fifteen-year period, an evolving lineup of musicians played with Dawson and Gauthier in the New Riders.  These included among others, guitarists Allen Kemp, Gary Vogensen, and Evan Morgan; bass players Fred Campbell, Bill Laymon, and Michael White; and drummers Val Fuentes, and Greg Lagardo.

Some projects had the current line-up performing new material and others reworked older material.  On some albums, such as Midnight Moonlight, the band's sound was less influenced by electric country rock and more by acoustic bluegrass music.

Retirement: 1997–2005
In 1997, the New Riders of the Purple Sage split up. Dawson retired from music and moved to Mexico to become an English teacher. By this time, Nelson had started his own David Nelson Band. There was a reunion performance in 2001. In 2002, the New Riders accepted a Lifetime Achievement Award from High Times magazine. On hand were a frail Dawson (suffering from emphysema), Nelson, Cage, Dryden and Torbert's widow Patti.  The band performed "Panama Red" and "Lonesome LA Cowboy" with Peter Rowan as part of the celebration. In the spring of 2004, Cage sat in at several gigs with the David Nelson Band.

NRPS revival: 2005–present
Shortly after the death of Spencer Dryden, a reconstituted line-up of the New Riders began touring in late 2005. It features David Nelson and Buddy Cage, alongside guitarist Michael Falzarano, bassist Ronnie Penque, and drummer Johnny Markowski.  They have released a live album, Wanted: Live at Turkey Trot, and two studio albums, Where I Come From and 17 Pine Avenue.

Allen Kemp died on June 25, 2009. John "Marmaduke" Dawson died in Mexico on July 21, 2009, at the age of 64.

Pedal steel guitarist Buddy Cage died on February 5, 2020, at age 73.

Discography

Studio and live albums

Compilation albums

Singles 
Seven-inch singles released by the New Riders of the Purple Sage are:

Timeline of band members
The membership of the New Riders of the Purple Sage has changed many times.  The following table shows a somewhat simplified version of the history of the band's lineups.

Timeline

References

External links

 
 New Riders of the Purple Sage biography on New Musical Express
 New Riders of the Purple Sage fan site www.NewRidersOfThePurpleSage.com
 New Riders of the Purple Sage history on fan site www.TheNewRiders.com
 New Riders of the Purple Sage on the Internet Archive's live music archive
 New Riders of the Purple Sage discography on Softshoe's Music Matters Site
 New Riders of the Purple Sage discography on DeadDisc.com
 Gearing, Brian. "New Riders of the Purple Sage, Station 2, Norfolk, VA, 12/10/05" concert review, JamBands.com, January 2, 2006
 Greenhaus, Mike. "Buddy Cage and The New Riders Ride Again", JamBands.com, June 23, 2006
 Joyce, Michael. "Hobblin' to the New Riders", KyndMusic, June 9, 2006
 Terpeny, David. "Buddy Cage Returns to the Garden of Eden", KyndMusic, July 28, 2007
 "New Riders of the Purple Sage", K-HiTS 106.7, ca. November, 2008
 Flisher, Chris. "New Riders of the Purple Sage", Worcester Phoenix, October 1994
 Jackson, Blair. "The New Riders Return with a Fine New Album", dead.net
 Dawson, John. "The Early Days of the New Riders", nrps.net
 Official web site of the reunion lineup of the New Riders of the Purple Sage
 Historical official web site of the New Riders of the Purple Sage

American country rock groups
Musical groups from San Francisco
Grateful Dead
Musical groups established in 1969
Musical groups disestablished in 1997
Musical groups reestablished in 2005
Rock music groups from California
Columbia Records artists
MCA Records artists
A&M Records artists
Jerry Garcia
1969 establishments in California
Relix Records artists